The Super Show was the first Asia-wide live concert tour by South Korean boy band, Super Junior. The tour commenced five months after the release of the group's second studio album, Don't Don. The concert covers most songs from the group's first two studio albums, including their hit single, "U," and also subgroup hits from Super Junior-K.R.Y., Super Junior-T, and Super Junior-M. The tour kicked off with three stops in South Korea and expanded its routes to Thailand and China.

History
The Super Show Tour is the first Asia-wide concert tour by Super Junior since their debut in November 2005. The tour was first announced in January, four months after the release of their second studio album, Don't Don. 13,000 tickets for the concert in Seoul, South Korea were placed for auction online on January 22, 2008. As soon as the auction began at 5:00 PM, over 120,000 fans simultaneously loaded onto the site and crashed the server. As soon as the server was back in commission, all 13,000 tickets were sold out in 18 minutes. A second ticket auction occurred on January 28 at 8:00 PM for the remaining seats and was just as successful. Due to the success of the sales, the organizers decided to add an extra show on February 22, and the corresponding tickets were all sold out in five minutes.

The tour reached Bangkok, Thailand on July 12, 2008, and Shanghai on November 22, 2008. A portion of the tickets for Shanghai's concert were scalped for over ¥7 thousand. Two encore concerts were held in Seoul on the first weekend of January 2009 and two weeks later, the concert was held in Nanjing, China. Super Junior became the first Korean artist to hold a solo concert in Nanjing, having their tickets being scalped for ¥6 thousand. The Super Show Tour also broke the record for being the first concert ever in China to have a "standing" stage.

Super Show was also expected to tour Hong Kong, Taipei (Taiwan), and Tokyo (Japan), but due to schedule conflicts, the tour was unable to go to those cities. The last stop for Super Show was in Chengdu (China)in March 2009.

The live Super Show Tour Concert Album was released on May 19, 2008, in South Korea and the DVD was released on October 1, 2008, selling over 15,000 copies domestically.

Opening acts and special appearances
Zhang Liyin was the opening act for the last Super Show concert in Chengdu on March 7, 2009, singing "I Will" and "The Left Shore of Happiness." X-Mas of TRAX was also the guest performer of the last Super Show, playing the guitar for Heechul's solo performance, "Crazy." Super Junior-M member Henry performed the violin bridge of "Don't Don" of every show, and along with Zhou Mi, performed with the rest of Super Junior-M in the China tour stops.

Set list

Tour dates

Personnel
 Super Junior – performers
 SM Entertainment – organizers
 DREAM MAKER ENTERCOM, CREAZONE – promoters
 True Music (Thailand) – overseas organizers

Live album

Super Show - Super Junior The 1st Asia Tour Concert Album is the first live album of  South Korean boy band Super Junior. It was released on May 19, 2008, by SM Entertainment. The songs in this album are direct recordings from their concerts at the Olympic Fencing Gymnasium in Seoul, South Korea from February 22 to 24, the first stop of their Super Show. It was also released in Taiwan by Avex Taiwan on June 27, 2008.  It debuted at number one on Taiwan's G-Music Weekly G-Music J-Pop/K-Pop Chart with a percentage sales of 27.58%.

Track listing

Charts

References

External links

  Super Junior Official Site

2008 concert tours
2009 concert tours
Super Junior concert tours